Kim Yeong-mi, nicknamed "Pancake" (born March 10, 1991) is a South Korean curler. She was the lead, but now is the alternate on Team Kim Eun-jung. The Kim team represented South Korea at the 2018 Winter Olympics, where they won a silver medal.

Career
While still a junior curler, Kim first represented her country at the women's level at the 2012 Pacific-Asia Curling Championships, playing third for Kim Eun-jung, who she also played with in juniors. There, the team won a bronze medal. The team returned to the event in 2014, where they won a bronze medal. This would've qualified them for the 2015 World Championships, but the Worlds were held in Japan, which qualified over South Korea as hosts. The team would, however, win a gold medal at the 2016 Pacific-Asia Curling Championships, earning them the right to play in the 2017 World Women's Curling Championship in China, where they finished sixth. Also, in 2017, the team won a silver medal at the 2017 Asian Winter Games.

Team Kim won the 2017 South Korean championship, qualifying the team to represent South Korea on home ice at the 2018 Winter Olympics. The team began the 2017-18 curling season by winning the 2017 Pacific-Asia Curling Championships. As the host nation, the team received celebrity status in Korea as the "garlic girls", as their hometown of Uiseong is known for its garlic production. The team had an impressive run, making it to the gold medal final, where they lost to Sweden's Anna Hasselborg rink. The next month, the team then played in the 2018 Ford World Women's Curling Championship where they lost in the quarterfinals.

The garlic girls did not play much in the 2018–19 season amidst a coaching scandal, which involved the country's sport federation vice president verbally abusing the team. The team did play in the final event of the season, the 2019 WCT Arctic Cup where they finished with a 1–3 record, missing the playoffs.

Team Kim returned to the World Curling Tour for the 2019–20 season but with her sister Kyeong-ae skipping. They qualified for the playoffs at the 2019 Cameron's Brewing Oakville Fall Classic, the 2019 Stu Sells Oakville Tankard and finished runner-up at the inaugural WCT Uiseong International Curling Cup. Kim Eun-jung rejoined the team at the 2019 Curlers Corner Autumn Gold Curling Classic, where she would throw second stones. They had a quarterfinal finish. Team Kim also had a quarterfinal finish the following week at the 2019 Canad Inns Women's Classic, where Kim Eun-jung returned to throwing skip stones. They made it to the final of the 2019 Changan Ford International Curling Elite and finished fourth at the 2019 China Open in December 2019. In the new year, they had a quarterfinal finish at the International Bernese Ladies Cup, and they won the Glynhill Ladies International. It would be the team's last event of the season as both the Players' Championship and the Champions Cup Grand Slam events were cancelled due to the COVID-19 pandemic.

The Kim rink began the abbreviated 2020–21 season by winning their national championship at the 2020 Korean Women's Curling Championship. After finishing 6–0 through the round robin, her team defeated Kim Min-ji 6–5 in the 1 vs. 2 page playoff game and won 7–5 over Gim Un-chi in the championship final. Their win qualified them to represent Korea at the 2021 World Women's Curling Championship. The team had a slow start, losing their first four games before going 7–2 in their final nine games. Their 7–6 record placed them seventh after the round robin, not enough to qualify for the playoffs and the 2022 Winter Olympics. The team also changed home clubs during the season, switching from the Uiseong Curling Club to the Gangneung Curling Centre after their contract expired with the Gyeongsangbukdo Sports Council.

Team Kim began the 2021–22 season at the 2021 Korean Curling Championships in June, which also doubled as the selection event for the 2022 Winter Olympics in Beijing, China. Through the event, the team posted a strong 11–1 record, once again securing the national title. The team also won their next event, the 2021 Alberta Curling Series: Saville Shoot-Out in September, after an undefeated record. Elsewhere on tour, the team reached the semifinals of both the 2021 Sherwood Park Women's Curling Classic and the 2021 Masters Grand Slam event. In international play, Team Kim represented South Korea at the 2021 Pacific-Asia Curling Championships. The team finished the round robin with a 5–1 record, tied with Japan. Japan had a better draw shot challenge record, forcing Korea into a semifinal match against Kazakhstan. Team Kim beat Kazakhstan but lost to Japan in the gold medal game, settling for silver. Because they had failed to qualify for the Olympics at the 2021 World Championship, the team then had to play in the Olympic Qualification Event to qualify South Korea for the 2022 Winter Olympics. The team posted a 6–2 record through the round robin, putting them into the playoffs. There, they lost to Japan in their first game but rebounded to beat Latvia in their second, qualifying Korea for the Winter Games. At the Olympics, the team could not replicate their success from PyeongChang 2018 and finished the event in eighth with a 4–5 record. The team had much more success at the 2022 World Women's Curling Championship. They finished the round robin with a 9–3 record, in second place. This gave them a bye to the semifinals, where they beat the host Canadian team skipped by Kerri Einarson. This put them into the gold medal game where they played Switzerland, skipped by Silvana Tirinzoni. The team was not as successful against the Swiss, losing to them 7–6, settling for the silver medal, Korea's best-ever finish at the Worlds. A few weeks later, the team wrapped up their season at the 2022 Champions Cup, where they lost in a tiebreaker to Einarson.

Personal life
Her younger sister Kim Kyeong-ae is the third on her team. She is married.

Grand Slam record

Former events

References

External links

Kim Yeong-mi | Profile on Winter Universiade 2017 results site | FISU
Kim Yeong-mi | Profile on Winter Universiade 2015 results site | FISU

1991 births
Living people
South Korean female curlers
Asian Games medalists in curling
Curlers at the 2017 Asian Winter Games
Medalists at the 2017 Asian Winter Games
Asian Games silver medalists for South Korea
Curlers at the 2018 Winter Olympics
Olympic curlers of South Korea
Olympic silver medalists for South Korea
Medalists at the 2018 Winter Olympics
Olympic medalists in curling
People from Uiseong County
Pacific-Asian curling champions
Curlers at the 2022 Winter Olympics
Sportspeople from North Gyeongsang Province
21st-century South Korean women
Competitors at the 2017 Winter Universiade